Arremonops is a genus of Neotropical birds in the family Passerellidae.  All species are found in Central America, Mexico, and/or northern South America.  The olive sparrow reaches southern Texas.

Species 
It contains the following species:

See also 

 Sparrow

References

External links 
 Avibase

 
Bird genera
American sparrows
Taxa named by Robert Ridgway
Taxonomy articles created by Polbot